Trinity is a town in Morgan County, Alabama, United States. It is included in the Decatur Metropolitan Area and the Huntsville-Decatur Combined Statistical Area. As of the 2020 census, the population of the town was 2,526, up from 2,095 in 2010. It was incorporated in 1901.

History

Trinity was developed in the 1810s as area plantation owners built houses atop Trinity Mountain to escape the mosquito-infested lowlands. A post office operated at Trinity from 1848 to 1853. The post office reopened under the name "Trinity Station" in 1866. The town incorporated in 1901, and changed its name to simply "Trinity" two years later.

Geography
Trinity is located in northwestern Morgan County across a scattered area mostly between U.S. Route 72 on the north and State Route 24 to the south (though the town's municipal boundaries extend slightly beyond each road). Decatur lies just to the east, and  Wheeler Lake (part of the Tennessee River) lies to the north. The southern parts of the town are located atop Trinity Mountain, a broad ridge that rises several hundred feet above the surrounding terrain. The town is bordered to the west by Lawrence County.

Demographics

2000 census
At the 2000 census there were 1,841 people, 691 households, and 563 families living in the town. The racial makeup of the town was 88.00% White, 9.61% Black or African American, 1.25% Native American, 0.11% Asian, 0.16% from other races, and 0.87% from two or more races. 1.14% of the population were Hispanic or Latino of any race.

Of the 691 households 38.4% had children under the age of 18 living with them, 69.9% were married couples living together, 8.5% had a female householder with no husband present, and 18.4% were non-families. 16.2% of households were one person and 6.5% were one person aged 65 or older. The average household size was 2.65 and the average family size was 2.96.

The age distribution was 25.7% under the age of 18, 6.1% from 18 to 24, 31.2% from 25 to 44, 26.1% from 45 to 64, and 10.8% 65 or older. The median age was 38 years. For every 100 females, there were 94.6 males. For every 100 females age 18 and over, there were 91.1 males.

The median household income was $54,271 and the median family income  was $60,139. Males had a median income of $43,393 versus $27,552 for females. The per capita income for the town was $21,467. About 4.6% of families and 6.0% of the population were below the poverty line, including 7.7% of those under age 18 and 5.8% of those age 65 or over.

2010 census
At the 2010 census there were 2,095 people, 783 households, and 647 families living in the town. The racial makeup of the town was 88.6% White, 6.7% Black or African American, 1.1% Native American, 0.2% Asian, 1.7% from other races, and 1.6% from two or more races. 3.3% of the population were Hispanic or Latino of any race.

Of the 783 households 35.8% had children under the age of 18 living with them, 71.9% were married couples living together, 6.9% had a female householder with no husband present, and 17.4% were non-families. 14.6% of households were one person and 5.4% were one person aged 65 or older. The average household size was 2.68 and the average family size was 2.95.

The age distribution was 25.8% under the age of 18, 6.0% from 18 to 24, 26.2% from 25 to 44, 29.5% from 45 to 64, and 12.6% 65 or older. The median age was 40.3 years. For every 100 females, there were 100.7 males. For every 100 females age 18 and over, there were 101.9 males.

The median household income was $61,060 and the median family income  was $71,818. Males had a median income of $54,250 versus $34,205 for females. The per capita income for the town was $28,628. About .9% of families and 2.7% of the population were below the poverty line, including 1.7% of those under age 18 and 3.7% of those age 65 or over.

2020 census

As of the 2020 United States census, there were 2,526 people, 871 households, and 637 families residing in the town.

References

External links

Towns in Morgan County, Alabama
Towns in Alabama
Decatur metropolitan area, Alabama
Huntsville-Decatur, AL Combined Statistical Area